"Half-Truism" is a song by the American punk rock band The Offspring. The song is featured as the opening track on the band's eighth studio album, Rise and Fall, Rage and Grace (2008), and was released as its fourth and final single on May 12, 2009. It impacted radio on the same day.

Premiere
"Half-Truism" was first premiered before the release of the album at the Australian Soundwave Festival, which The Offspring headlined in 2008. It was the second song from the album to be played live (the first being "Hammerhead" which was played in 2007 at the Summersonic festival).

Charts

In popular culture
"Half-Truism" is featured as a playable song in the video game Guitar Hero On Tour: Modern Hits.
The song also appears in the commercial for the 2009 Virgin Tour.

Personnel
Dexter Holland – vocals, rhythm guitar
Noodles – lead guitar, backing vocals
Greg K. – bass guitar, backing vocals
Josh Freese – drums

References

The Offspring songs
2008 songs
2009 singles
Songs written by Dexter Holland
Song recordings produced by Bob Rock